Lathrop State Park is a Colorado state park located  west of Walsenburg. The state purchased the property in 1962 and opened Colorado's first state park here later that same year. It is named after Harold Lathrop, the first director of state parks. The park features two lakes, Martin Lake and Horseshoe Lake, that offer fishing for tiger muskie (46-inch, 25-pound examples have been caught here), rainbow trout, bass, catfish, northern pike, blue gill, saugeye, and wipers.

The park also offers a beach, boating, water skiing, wind surfing, jet skiing, picnicking, hiking, wildlife viewing, camping, and a nine-hole golf course.

Lathrop is the only Colorado state park with its own golf course. The Walsenburg Golf Course was founded in 1965 and after two years of construction opened in 1967. It was built by 50 Walsenburg citizens and many local volunteers in a public/private partnership. The course's restaurant/lounge overlooks the lakes and the National Natural Landmark Spanish Peaks.

Over 107,000 visitors passed through Lathrop State Park in the last year for which figures are available.

References

State parks of Colorado
Protected areas of Huerfano County, Colorado
Protected areas established in 1962